Vince Nagy de Losonc (4 March 1886 – 1 June 1964) was a Hungarian politician, who served as Interior Minister between 1918 and 1919 during the Hungarian Democratic Republic. After the establishment of the Hungarian Soviet Republic, he returned to Szatmárnémeti, where the occupying Romanian Army imprisoned him for 9 months. From 1922, he was a lawyer. From 1928, he was the chairman of the Independence Party. After the German occupation (March 21, 1944) Nagy had to escape because of his anti-Nazi views. After the Second World War, he rejected the cooperation with the Hungarian Communist Party (as a Smallholders Party member) and so he was excluded, a;pmg with 18 other members from the party.

From 1948, he lived in the United States. He took part in Hungarian emigrant politics. Among other positions, he was an advisor at the Radio Free Europe/Radio Liberty.

Works
 Szálasi és társai a vádlottak padján

References
 Magyar Életrajzi Lexikon
 Markó László: Ki kicsoda a magyar történelemben, Helikon, 2005

1886 births
1965 deaths
People from Satu Mare
Hungarian Interior Ministers
Hungarian people of the Hungarian–Romanian War
Hungarian prisoners of war
Prisoners of war held by Romania
Hungarian–Romanian War prisoners of war
Members of the National Assembly of Hungary (1945–1947)
Hungarian emigrants to the United States